Stradone may refer to:

 Stradone, County Cavan
 Giovanni Stradone (10 November 1911 - 2 February 1981), an Italian painter.